Ian Andrew Ziering (born March 30, 1964) is an American actor best known for his role as Steve Sanders on the television series Beverly Hills, 90210, which he played from 1990 to 2000. He is also the voice of Vinnie on Biker Mice from Mars. From 2013 to 2018, he starred as Fin Shepard in the Sharknado film series. In 2019, he played the DC Comics character Blue Devil on the series Swamp Thing.

Early life
Ziering was born in Newark, New Jersey, the youngest of three boys for Muriel (1925–1998) and Paul M. Ziering (1921–2008), an educator, orchestra leader, and saxophonist. He grew up in West Orange, New Jersey and has two older brothers, Jeff and Barry. Ziering is Jewish (his family is from Russia and Austria). He graduated from West Orange High School in 1982, and from William Paterson University in 1988.

Career
In 1990, Ziering began his portrayal of the character Steve Sanders on the hit series Beverly Hills, 90210. Sanders was a high school student and friend of Brandon Walsh (Jason Priestly), one of the series' other central characters. He is one of only four series regulars to appear on the show for its entire duration of ten seasons until 2000.

In 1998, Ziering was cast as the voice of Dr. Niko "Nick" Tatopoulos in Godzilla: The Series, which was a direct follow-up to the 1998 film. Ziering replaced Matthew Broderick, who played Nick Tatopolous in the film.

In 2006, Ziering produced, directed and starred in the short film Man vs. Monday, which won the Audience Choice Award at the 2006 Fort Lauderdale International Film Festival. Also in 2006, he won the Best Actor Award at the 2006 Monaco Film Festival for his portrayal of Francis in the independent film Stripped Down.

Ziering has also appeared in the television series JAG, What I Like About You, The Doctors as Erich Aldrich and Guiding Light as Cameron Stewart. He also had a role in the videogame Freelancer as the protagonist, Edison Trent.

He was a celebrity dancer in 2007 on Season 4 of Dancing with the Stars. His professional dance partner was Cheryl Burke, who won the competition in Season 2 with partner Drew Lachey and Season 3 with partner Emmitt Smith. Ziering made it to the semi-finals, and received a perfect score (three 10s) from the judges for one of his two dances in the round. However, it was not enough to reach the finals: he and Burke were eliminated during the results show the next day on May 15, 2007. In 2016 Burke said the experience of working with Ziering made her want to "slit her wrists". She later apologized, not to Ziering, but for making a thoughtless reference to suicide. Ziering did not comment publicly on Burke's comments beyond re-tweeting a message from a former co-worker that praised him as a great person to be around.

On June 18, 2007, Variety reported that Ziering had auditioned the previous week for the opportunity to succeed Bob Barker as host of The Price Is Right. The job ultimately went to Drew Carey. Ziering's ex-wife, Nikki, was a model on the show from 1999 to 2002.

In May, 2013, it was announced that Ziering would be performing with Chippendales as a celebrity guest star for four weeks at the Rio All Suite Hotel and Casino in Las Vegas.

In 2015, he appeared on Celebrity Apprentice on NBC.

In 2018, he competed on Worst Cooks in America: Celebrity Edition.

In 2019, he was cast to play the superhero, Blue Devil, on the show Swamp Thing, in the DC Universe streaming service. The show ran for only one season, though it was positively received by critics and audience.

Personal life
Ziering married Playboy model Nikki Schieler in July 1997. They filed for divorce in February 2002, citing irreconcilable differences. Nikki has said that the separation was contentious, and that she was not given any support or help moving out.

On February 3, 2010, Ziering announced his engagement to Erin Ludwig. The couple married at a ceremony in Newport Beach, California, on May 28, 2010. They have two daughters, Mia Loren (born April 25, 2011) and Penna Mae (born April 25, 2013). On October 31, 2019, Ziering announced that the couple had separated.

Filmography

Film

Television

Video games

Dancing with the Stars season 4

References

External links

1964 births
Living people
American male soap opera actors
American male television actors
American male voice actors
American people of Austrian-Jewish descent
American people of Russian-Jewish descent
Jewish American male actors
Male actors from Newark, New Jersey
Participants in American reality television series
People from West Orange, New Jersey
The Apprentice (franchise) contestants
West Orange High School (New Jersey) alumni
William Paterson University alumni
21st-century American Jews
20th-century American male actors
21st-century American male actors